Suzy Vernon (1901–1997) was a French film actress. Vernon was born Amelie Paris in Perpignan in Southern France. She began her screen career in 1923 during the silent era and went on to appear in just under fifty films. She generally played the female lead, although she occasionally also appeared in supporting roles.

Selected filmography

 The Portrait (1923)
 Faces of Children (1925)
 Barocco (1925)
 The Revenge of the Pharaohs (1925)
 Nitchevo (1926)
 The Bordello in Rio (1927)
 Martyr (1927)
 Napoléon (1927)
 The Last Waltz (1927)
 Sajenko the Soviet (1928)
 The Gambling Den of Montmartre (1928)
 Guilty (1928)
 The President (1928)
 Because I Love You (1928)
 Indizienbeweis (1929)
 A Foolish Maiden (1929)
 The Green Monocle (1929)
 Counter Investigation (1930)
 The Rebel (1931)
 The Man in Evening Clothes (1931)
 Miche (1932)
 Sergeant X (1932)
 A Star Disappears (1932)
 To Be Loved (1933)
 The Porter from Maxim's (1933)
 A Man of Gold (1934)
 Napoléon Bonaparte (1935)
 Wells in Flames (1937)

References

Bibliography
 Crisp, C.G. The classic French cinema, 1930-1960. Indiana University Press, 1993 
 Powrie, Phil & Rebillard, Éric. Pierre Batcheff and stardom in 1920s French cinema. Edinburgh University Press, 2009

External links

1901 births
1997 deaths
French film actresses
French silent film actresses
People from Perpignan
20th-century French actresses